Sara Ramadhani Makera (born 30 December 1987) is a Tanzanian long distance runner who specialises in the marathon. She competed in the women's marathon event at the 2016 Summer Olympics where she finished in 121st place with a time of 3:00:03.

In 2019, she represented Tanzania at the 2019 African Games held in Rabat, Morocco. She competed in the women's half marathon and she did not finish her race.

References

External links
 

1987 births
Living people
Tanzanian female long-distance runners
Tanzanian female marathon runners
Place of birth missing (living people)
Athletes (track and field) at the 2016 Summer Olympics
Olympic athletes of Tanzania
Athletes (track and field) at the 2019 African Games
African Games competitors for Tanzania